South Carolina Highway 75 (SC 75) is an  state highway in the U.S. state of South Carolina. The highway is mainly rural.

Route description
The western terminus of SC 75 is located at an intersection with SC 5 near Van Wyck. Much of the highway has a  speed limit. Heading east, SC 75 passes the AME Zion Church and Van Wyck's farmland as well as the "downtown" of the tiny community. Two miles to the east, SC 75 intersects US 521 and is concurrent with the highway until they split three miles to the north in the unincorporated community of Hancock. Here, US 521 continues north and SC 75 turns east, traveling two miles until it ends at the North Carolina state line, the roadway continuing east as North Carolina Highway 75 toward Monroe, North Carolina.

History
Established in 1937 as a renumbering of SC 12, it originally ran from US 521 to the North Carolina state line in Hancock. By 1964, SC 75 was extended to its current western terminus at SC 5 in Van Wyck, replacing part of SC 504.

Major intersections

Van Wyck truck route

South Carolina Highway 75 Truck (SC 75 Truck) is a  truck route of SC 75 bypassing Van Wyck. It begins at SC 75's southern terminus at SC 5. It follows SC 5 until it has an interchange with U.S. Route 521 (US 521). It then follows US 521 until they meet SC 75.

See also

References

External links

075
Transportation in Lancaster County, South Carolina